The 1941–42 New York Rangers season was the franchise's 16th season. In the regular season, New York led the NHL with 60 points, and compiled a 29–17–2 record. The Rangers lost in the NHL semi-finals to the Toronto Maple Leafs, four games to two.

Regular season

Final standings

Record vs. opponents

Schedule and results

|- align="center" bgcolor="#CCFFCC"
| 1 || 1 || @ Toronto Maple Leafs || 4–3 || 1–0–0
|- align="center" bgcolor="#CCFFCC"
| 2 || 9 || @ Detroit Red Wings || 3–1 || 2–0–0
|- align="center" bgcolor="#FFBBBB"
| 3 || 15 || Boston Bruins || 2–1 || 2–1–0
|- align="center" bgcolor="#FFBBBB"
| 4 || 16 || @ Boston Bruins || 2–1 || 2–2–0
|- align="center" bgcolor="#FFBBBB"
| 5 || 18 || Toronto Maple Leafs || 8–6 || 2–3–0
|- align="center" bgcolor="#FFBBBB"
| 6 || 20 || Brooklyn Americans || 4–1 || 2–4–0
|- align="center" bgcolor="#CCFFCC"
| 7 || 22 || @ Montreal Canadiens || 7–2 || 3–4–0
|- align="center" bgcolor="#FFBBBB"
| 8 || 23 || Montreal Canadiens || 6–4 || 3–5–0
|- align="center" bgcolor="#CCFFCC"
| 9 || 25 || Chicago Black Hawks || 5–4 OT || 4–5–0
|- align="center" bgcolor="#CCFFCC"
| 10 || 29 || Detroit Red Wings || 4–1 || 5–5–0
|- align="center" bgcolor="#CCFFCC"
| 11 || 30 || @ Chicago Black Hawks || 5–1 || 6–5–0
|-

|- align="center" bgcolor="#CCFFCC"
| 12 || 7 || Boston Bruins || 5–4 || 7–5–0
|- align="center" bgcolor="#CCFFCC"
| 13 || 11 || @ Brooklyn Americans || 5–3 || 8–5–0
|- align="center" bgcolor="#FFBBBB"
| 14 || 13 || @ Toronto Maple Leafs || 2–1 || 8–6–0
|- align="center" bgcolor="#CCFFCC"
| 15 || 16 || Brooklyn Americans || 3–2 OT || 9–6–0
|- align="center" bgcolor="#FFBBBB"
| 16 || 18 || @ Chicago Black Hawks || 5–1 || 9–7–0
|- align="center" bgcolor="#CCFFCC"
| 17 || 21 || Montreal Canadiens || 4–3 OT || 10–7–0
|- align="center" bgcolor="#FFBBBB"
| 18 || 23 || @ Boston Bruins || 3–2 || 10–8–0
|- align="center" bgcolor="#CCFFCC"
| 19 || 25 || Chicago Black Hawks || 5–2 || 11–8–0
|- align="center" bgcolor="#CCFFCC"
| 20 || 27 || @ Montreal Canadiens || 4–2 || 12–8–0
|- align="center" bgcolor="#CCFFCC"
| 21 || 28 || @ Detroit Red Wings || 3–1 || 13–8–0
|- align="center" bgcolor="#CCFFCC"
| 22 || 31 || @ Brooklyn Americans || 4–3 || 14–8–0
|-

|- align="center" bgcolor="white"
| 23 || 1 || Toronto Maple Leafs || 3–3 OT || 14–8–1
|- align="center" bgcolor="#CCFFCC"
| 24 || 6 || Detroit Red Wings || 3–2 || 15–8–1
|- align="center" bgcolor="#CCFFCC"
| 25 || 13 || Brooklyn Americans || 9–2 || 16–8–1
|- align="center" bgcolor="#FFBBBB"
| 26 || 17 || @ Montreal Canadiens || 6–2 || 16–9–1
|- align="center" bgcolor="#CCFFCC"
| 27 || 18 || Montreal Canadiens || 5–4 OT || 17–9–1
|- align="center" bgcolor="#CCFFCC"
| 28 || 20 || @ Boston Bruins || 4–2 || 18–9–1
|- align="center" bgcolor="#CCFFCC"
| 29 || 24 || @ Detroit Red Wings || 3–2 || 19–9–1
|- align="center" bgcolor="#CCFFCC"
| 30 || 25 || Detroit Red Wings || 11–2 || 20–9–1
|-

|- align="center" bgcolor="#CCFFCC"
| 31 || 1 || Toronto Maple Leafs || 7–2 || 21–9–1
|- align="center" bgcolor="#CCFFCC"
| 32 || 3 || @ Brooklyn Americans || 3–2 OT || 22–9–1
|- align="center" bgcolor="#CCFFCC"
| 33 || 5 || Boston Bruins || 4–1 || 23–9–1
|- align="center" bgcolor="#FFBBBB"
| 34 || 7 || @ Toronto Maple Leafs || 6–4 || 23–10–1
|- align="center" bgcolor="#CCFFCC"
| 35 || 8 || @ Chicago Black Hawks || 4–3 || 24–10–1
|- align="center" bgcolor="#FFBBBB"
| 36 || 10 || Chicago Black Hawks || 5–2 || 24–11–1
|- align="center" bgcolor="#FFBBBB"
| 37 || 14 || @ Montreal Canadiens || 5–3 || 24–12–1
|- align="center" bgcolor="#FFBBBB"
| 38 || 15 || Brooklyn Americans || 5–1 || 24–13–1
|- align="center" bgcolor="#FFBBBB"
| 39 || 17 || Montreal Canadiens || 2–1 OT || 24–14–1
|- align="center" bgcolor="#CCFFCC"
| 40 || 22 || Chicago Black Hawks || 3–2 || 25–14–1
|- align="center" bgcolor="#CCFFCC"
| 41 || 24 || @ Boston Bruins || 4–3 || 26–14–1
|- align="center" bgcolor="#CCFFCC"
| 42 || 26 || Detroit Red Wings || 7–4 || 27–14–1
|-

|- align="center" bgcolor="white"
| 43 || 3 || @ Brooklyn Americans || 4–4 OT || 27–14–2
|- align="center" bgcolor="#FFBBBB"
| 44 || 5 || @ Detroit Red Wings || 5–2 || 27–15–2
|- align="center" bgcolor="#FFBBBB"
| 45 || 7 || @ Toronto Maple Leafs || 4–2 || 27–16–2
|- align="center" bgcolor="#CCFFCC"
| 46 || 8 || Toronto Maple Leafs || 2–0 || 28–16–2
|- align="center" bgcolor="#FFBBBB"
| 47 || 12 || Boston Bruins || 2–1 || 28–17–2
|- align="center" bgcolor="#CCFFCC"
| 48 || 15 || @ Chicago Black Hawks || 5–1 || 29–17–2
|-

Playoffs

Key:  Win  Loss

Player statistics
Skaters

Goaltenders

†Denotes player spent time with another team before joining Rangers. Stats reflect time with Rangers only.
‡Traded mid-season. Stats reflect time with Rangers only.

See also
 1941–42 NHL season

References

New York Rangers seasons
New York Rangers
New York Rangers
New York Rangers
New York Rangers
Madison Square Garden
1940s in Manhattan